Make It Funky – The Big Payback: 1971–1975 is the fourth of several James Brown era overviews released by Polydor Records in 1996. Expanding on the 1984 LP compilation Doing It To Death – The James Brown Story 1970–1973, it covers 1971–1975.

Track listing
Disc 1
"Escape-ism" - 4:02
"Hot Pants, Parts 1 & 2" - 6:55
"I'm a Greedy Man" - 7:08
"Make It Funky, Parts 1, 2, 3 & 4" - 12:45
"King Heroin" - 3:55
"I Got Ants in My Pants (and I Want to Dance)" - 7:26
"There It Is" - 5:47
"Get On the Good Foot" - 5:44
"Don't Tell It" - 8:25
previously unreleased complete version
"I Got a Bag of My Own" - 3:46
"Down and Out in New York City" - 5:21
previously unreleased version with spoken intro
"Think '73" - 3:12
"Make It Good to Yourself" (interlude) - 2:19
previously unreleased version	

Disc 2
"The Payback" - 7:39
"Stoned to the Bone" - 4:00
"Mind Power" - 4:08
previously unreleased alternate version
"World of Soul" - 5:44
previously unreleased
"Papa Don't Take No Mess" - 13:50
"Coldblooded" - 5:04
previously unreleased undubbed version
"I Can't Stand It "76"" - 8:11
"My Thang" - 4:15
"Funky President (People It's Bad)" - 4:08
previously unreleased original speed master
"I Feel Good" - 3:02
"Problems" - 2:50
"Turn On the Heat and Build Some Fire" - 6:07
"Hot Pants Finale" (Live) - 7:20
previously unreleased version

References

1996 greatest hits albums
James Brown compilation albums
Polydor Records compilation albums